American Songs is a 1981 EP by the New York based No Wave music group Material.

Track listing
"Ciquiri" (Discomix) (Bill Laswell, Fred Maher, Michael Beinhorn, Robert Quine) – 6:22
"Detached" (Laswell, Maher, Beinhorn, Quine) – 5:02
"Discourse" (Laswell, Beinhorn, Cliff Cultreri, Bill Bacon – 4:05
"Slow Murder" (Laswell, Beinhorn, Cultreri, Bacon) – 3:59

Personnel
Bill Laswell – bass
Michael Beinhorn – synthesizer, vocals
Fred Maher – drums, guitar, vocals (tracks 1 and 2)
Cliff Cultreri – guitar (tracks 3 and 4)
Bill Bacon – drums (tracks 3 and 4)

Additional personnel
Robert Quine – guitar (tracks 1 and 2)

Production
Tracks 1 and 2 recorded March 1 & 2, 1981. Produced by Material with Martin Bisi.
Tracks 3 and 4 recorded in March, 1980. Produced by Material with Martin Bisi.

Release history
American Songs – 1981 – Red Rec., EP 001 (12")
American Songs – 1981 – Celluloid, CEL 6596 (12")
"Ciquiri"/"Detached" single – 1982 – Red Rec., RS 12012 (12²)
"Discourse"/"Slow Murder" single – 1980 – Red Rec., 45001 (7")
"Discourse"/"Slow Murder" single – 198? – Celluloid, CEL 6219 (7")

References

Material (band) albums
Post-punk EPs
1980 EPs
Celluloid Records albums